Kingella is a genus of bacteria of the family Neisseriaceae. It belongs to the HACEK group of fastidious Gram-negative bacteria that tend to cause endocarditis. Kingella kingae is its type species.

Species 
As of 2021, five species belong to the genus:

Kingella denitrificans Snell & Lapage 1976
Kingella kingae (Henriksen & Bøvre 1968) Henriksen & Bøvre 1976
Kingella negevensis El Houmami et al. 2017
Kingella oralis corrig. Dewhirst et al. 1993
Kingella potus Lawson et al. 2005

References 

Neisseriales